Alexander Irakliyevich Metreveli (born 2 November 1944) is a retired Soviet tennis player of Georgian background. He is an honorary citizen of Australia. His grandson Aleksandre Metreveli, also a professional tennis player, has represented Georgia in the Davis Cup.

Career
In 1962, aged 17, Metreveli lost 8–10, 6–3, 4–6 to Stanley Matthews in the final of the Wimbledon boys' championship.

He is best known for making the final at Wimbledon in 1973, where he lost to Jan Kodeš of Czechoslovakia. He reached a career-high singles ranking of world No. 9 in 1974 and won 9 ATP singles titles in his career. Metreveli was a member of the Dynamo sports society. He competed in professional tour events during the 1970s.

Grand Slam finals

Singles: 1 (1 runner-up)

Mixed doubles: 2 (2 runner-ups)

Grand Slam singles performance timeline

References

External links
 
 
 
  Metreveli Tennis Academy 

1944 births
Living people
Dynamo sports society athletes
Male tennis players from Georgia (country)
Sportspeople from Tbilisi
Soviet male tennis players
Russian television presenters
Soviet television presenters
Tennis commentators